Spesutie Island is a  island located in the Chesapeake Bay in Harford County, Maryland, United States. Spesutie Narrows bounds the island on the west and the bay bounds it on the north, east, and south. The island is part of Aberdeen Proving Ground.

History
Evidence has been found of the historic presence of Native Americans on Spesutie Island. In 1658, Lord Baltimore granted the island to Nathaniel Utie who named his manor house after his surname and the Latin word for hope, spes. The property remained in the Utie family until 1779 when Samuel Hughes purchased it. In 1802, William Smith bought the island, and his descendants would remain there for almost a century, though the War of 1812 brought some disruption. In late April 1813, troops under the command of Rear Admiral George Cockburn briefly occupied the island, and passing vessels such as  engaged in the forced purchase of cattle. The Smith family sold the island in 1900 and by 1927 ownership had passed to the Susquehanna Development Company. In 1936, J. P. Morgan, Jr. built a house on the island to use as a hunting lodge. The Spesutie Island Hunting and Fishing Club maintained the island until 1945 when the United States government purchased it and incorporated it into Aberdeen Proving Ground.

Other names
The United States Geological Survey records the following variant names for Spesutie Island: Bearsons Island, Spes Island, Spes Utia Island, Spes Utie Island, and Spesutia Island.

Wildlife
Spesutie Island is home to a large population of bald eagles.

See also
List of islands in Maryland

References

External links
Spesutia Island Marker — Historical Marker Database
NOAA Nautical Chart 12274 (showing Spesutie Island in the center)

Maryland islands of the Chesapeake Bay
Landforms of Harford County, Maryland
Uninhabited islands of Maryland